Casals is a Catalan surname, the plural form of Casal (house). Notable persons with that surname include:
Marta Casals Istomin (born 1936), wife of Pablo Casals and former president of Manhattan School of Music
Pablo Casals (1876-1973), cellist and conductor
Rosemary Casals (born 1948), American professional tennis player
Toni Casals Rueda (born 1980), Andorran ski mountaineer
"Sammy Casals", a police detective in the film Heat portrayed by Wes Studi

See also
Casal (disambiguation)

Catalan-language surnames